
Matching Tye is a village which forms part of the civil parish of Matching, in the County of Essex, England. It is 2.3 miles (3.7 km) east of Harlow, 2.9 Miles (4.8 km) south-east of Sawbridgeworth and 6.3 miles (10.4 km) north-east of Epping.

The actor and comedian Rik Mayall was born at Matching Tye.

Other Matching parish settlements 
 Carter's Green
 Housham Tye
 Matching
 Matching Green
 Newman's End

Transport 
There is no railway station in the village, the nearest active rail link is Harlow Mill, 4.2 miles from the village centre.

References

External links 

 Matching Parish Council

Villages in Essex
Matching, Essex